Gilberto Flores (born July 5, 1983 in Toledo, Brazil) is a Brazilian soccer midfielder.

Gilberto Flores was signed by the MetroStars from Brazilian club Ginásio Pinhalense de Esportes Atléticos after impressing in La Manga Cup in 2004. Flores has struggled to see playing time in his time with the MetroStars – although he has been relatively impressive in his brief playing time, he has struggled both with injuries that have kept him out much of the year, and with the difficult task of breaking into a very talented MetroStars midfield.

Injured in a game against the Revolution in 2004, Gilberto Flores could not recover his form and was released by the MetroStars in June 2005. He was picked up by the same New England team that he suffered his injury against, but was released by New England in November 2005 after appearing in just one match, in the US Open Cup.

References
Player profile on MLSnet

1983 births
Living people
Brazilian footballers
Brazilian expatriate footballers
New York Red Bulls players
New England Revolution players
Expatriate soccer players in the United States
Major League Soccer players
Association football midfielders
People from Toledo, Paraná
Sportspeople from Paraná (state)